Centre of Indian Trade Unions, CITU is a National level Trade Union in India and its trade union wing is a spearhead of the Indian Trade Union Movement. The Centre of Indian Trade Unions is today one of biggest assemblies of workers and classes of India. It has strong presence in the Indian state of Tripura besides a good presence in West Bengal, Kerala and Kanpur. They have an average presence in Tamil Nadu and Andhra Pradesh.

 CITU has a membership of approximately 6,200,000 in 2023.

Tapan Kumar Sen is the General Secretary and K. Hemalata is the president of CITU. Hemalata was the first woman president of CITU, who was elected after A. K. Padmanabhan. It runs a monthly organ named WORKING CLASS.

CITU is affiliated to the World Federation of Trade Unions.

References

External links

 

Trade unions in India
 
1970 establishments in India
World Federation of Trade Unions
Trade unions established in 1970